Barry Gifford (born October 18, 1946) is an American author, poet, and screenwriter known for his distinctive mix of American landscapes and prose influenced by film noir and Beat Generation writers.

Gifford is best known for his series of novels about Sailor and Lula, two star-crossed protagonists on a perpetual road trip. Published in seven novels between 1990 and 2015, the Sailor and Lula series has been described by Professor Andrei Codrescu as written in "a great comic realist" style that explores "an unmistakably American universe [...] populated by a huge and lovable humanity propelled on a tragic river of excess energy."<ref>Andrei Codrescu, forward to The Rooster Trapped in the Reptile Room: The Barry Gifford Reader; edited by Thomas A. McCarthy; NY: Seven Stories Press (2003), p xi</ref> The first book of the series, Wild at Heart, was adapted by director David Lynch for the 1990 film of the same title. Gifford went on to write the original screenplay for Lost Highway (1997) with Lynch. Perdita Durango, the third book in the Sailor and Lula series, was adapted into a 1997 film by Alex de la Iglesia with a script co-written by Gifford. His most recent book, Black Sun Rising / La Corazonado, published by Seven Stories Press in 2020, is a Western noir novella that traces the struggle of the first integrated Native American tribe to establish itself in North America.

Gifford also writes nonfiction and poetry.

Life and career
Gifford was born in a Chicago hotel room in 1946. His father was Jewish and his mother of Irish Catholic background. Gifford's father was in organized crime, and he spent his childhood largely in Chicago and New Orleans living in hotels. His childhood, as recounted in his long-running series of autobiographical tales known collectively as the Roy stories, is explored in the 2020 documentary Roy's World: Barry Gifford's Chicago. After college he joined the Air Force Reserves. After a short stint pursuing a possible career in baseball, Gifford focused on writing, both as a journalist and a poet. He lives in the San Francisco Bay Area.

Gifford's fourth novel, Wild at Heart: The Story of Sailor and Lula, caught the eye of director David Lynch, who adapted it into the screenplay and movie Wild at Heart. The movie won the Palme d'Or, the highest honor, at the Cannes Film Festival in 1990. The film's success boosted interest in Gifford's novels.  

Bibliography
Poetry
 The Blood of the Parade (1967)
 Coyote Tantras (1973)
 Persimmons: Poems for Paintings (1976)
 The Boy You Have Always Loved (1976)
 A Quinzaine in Return for a Portrait of Mary Sun (1977)
 Lives of the French Impressionist Painters (1978)
 Horse Hauling Timber out of Hokkaido Forest (1979)
 Beautiful Phantoms: Selected Poems 1968–1980 (1981)
 Giotto's Circle (1987)
 Ghosts No Horse Can Carry: Collected Poems 1967–1987 (1989)
 Flaubert at Key West (1994)
 Replies to Wang Wei Imagining Paradise: New and Selected Poems (2012)
 New York, 1960 (2016)

Essays and short stories
 A Boy's Novel (1973)
 Kerouac's Town, photographs by Marshall Clements (1973)
 Francis Goes to the Seashore (1982)
 The Devil Thumbs a Ride and Other Unforgettable Films (1988)
 New Mysteries of Paris (1991)
 Night People (1992)
 American Falls: The Collected Short Stories Do the Blind Dream? (2005)
 The Roy Stories (2013)
 The Cuban Club (2017)
 Roy's World (2020)

Non-fiction
 Jack's Book: An Oral Biography of Jack Kerouac, with Lawrence Lee (1978)
 Saroyan: A Biography, with Lawrence Lee (1984)
 Day at the Races: The Education of a Racetracker The Devil Thumbs a Ride & Other Unforgettable Films The Neighborhood of Baseball: A Personal History of the Chicago Cubs Really the Blues (introduction) The Phantom Father: A Memoir Out of the Past: Adventures in Film NoirNovels and novellas
 Landscape With Traveler: The Pillow Book of Francis Reeves (1980)
 Port Tropique (1980)
 Unfortunate Woman (1983)
 Wild at Heart: The Story of Sailor and Lula (1990) – Part 1 in the Sailor and Lula series
 Sailor's Holiday: The Wild Life of Sailor and Lula (1991) – Part 2 in the Sailor and Lula series
 59° and Raining: The Story of Perdita Durango (1992) – Part 3 in the Sailor and Lula series
 A Good Man to Know: A Semi-Documentary Fictional Memoir (1992)
 Arise and Walk (1995)
 Baby Cat-Face (1995) – Sailor and Lula make a brief appearance
 Sultans of Africa – Part 4 in the Sailor and Lula series
 Consuelo's Kiss – Part 5 in the Sailor and Lula series
 The Sinaloa Story (1998)
 Wyoming (2000)
 Bad Day for the Leopard Man – Part 6 in the Sailor and Lula series
 The Stars Above Veracruz (2006)
 Imagination of the Heart (2007) – Part 7 in the Sailor and Lula series
 Memories from a Sinking Ship (2007) - Winner of the 2007 Christopher Isherwood Foundation Award for Fiction
 Sailor & Lula: The Complete Novels (2010)
 Sad Stories of the Death of Kings (2010)
 The Up-Down (2015) - A coda to the Sailor and Lula stories, documenting the last 25 years in the life of their adult son, Pace Roscoe Ripley
 Sailor & Lula, Expanded Edition (2019)
 Black Sun Rising / La Corazonado (2020)

Graphic novels
 Perdita Durango (1995)

Other worksRead 'em and WeepBack in AmericaBordertown (2002)My Last MartiniThe Rooster Trapped in the Reptile Room: A Barry Gifford ReaderRosa BlancaHotel Room TrilogyImmortality (co-writer)

FilmographyWild at Heart (novel only) (1990)Hotel Room (screenplay, episodes "Blackout" and "Tricks") (1993)Lost Highway (screenplay, with David Lynch) (1997)Perdita Durango (screenplay, with David Trueba, Álex de la Iglesia, and Jorge Guerricaechevarría) (1997)City of Ghosts (screenplay with Matt Dillon and Mike Jones) (2002)The Phantom Father'' (2011)

References

External links
 Official website
 Official Facebook Page

Chicagoist Interview

1946 births
Living people
20th-century American novelists
21st-century American novelists
American male biographers
American male novelists
American male screenwriters
Writers from Chicago
20th-century American poets
21st-century American poets
American male poets
20th-century American biographers
21st-century American biographers
Screenwriters from Illinois
20th-century American male writers
21st-century American male writers
Novelists from Illinois
Historians from Illinois